Jacob Glarbjerg Larsen (born May 5, 1997) is a Danish former basketball player. A 6’11’’ (210 cm) post player, he joined the Gonzaga University Bulldogs for the 2016–17 season, but did not make his debut with the team until the 2017–18 season due to a knee injury suffered in a 2016 preseason practice.

Youth career
Born in Holte, Larsen started his career in the youth teams at Virum Basketball Klub in the northern outskirts of Copenhagen, and was promoted to the club’s men’s team in 2013. He played in the second-tier league in Denmark with the Virum Vipers. In 2014, he helped lead Virum to winning the Danish 1st Division Regular Season title and a trip to the semifinals.

In September 2015, Larsen signed with SISU Copenhagen. Larsen chose SISU since he wanted to play in the best league in Denmark and his familiarity to people from the Danish National Team, including the head coach, as well as many of the squad's youth players. Larsen was hampered by inflammation in his knee, but SISU was sympathetic to his recovery time. Larsen wanted to spend one-year training with professional competition before leaving for the United States to play college basketball after the summer of 2016. In October 2015, it was reported that Larsen was expected to miss the whole season with SISU due to injury.

Recruiting

In April 2014, Larsen announced his dreams of dominating the second best league in Denmark, then moving on to exerting his dominance in the best Danish league, and then playing college basketball, with hopes of displaying his talent in the NBA someday. In February 2015, while participating in the first-ever Basketball without Borders Global Camp in Manhattan, New York, Larsen was singled out as one of the top performers of the camp. He announced that he planned to enroll in college in 2016, and that Duke, Maryland, and George Washington were among his top suitors.

In October 2015, Larsen flew to the United States to take official visits to Maryland, Gonzaga, and Marquette. After he joined fellow Gonzaga commit Zach Collins in his recruiting trip to Spokane for the Zags' annual pre-season player scrimmage called Kraziness in the Kennel, he verbally committed to Gonzaga in November 2015. Larsen chose the Zags due to their successful track record with international players, especially those from Europe, like himself. He signed with Gonzaga during the early signing period later that week.

College career 
Larsen was sidelined the entire 2016-17 campaign with a knee injury, which he sustained in practice. In the 2017-18 season, Larsen saw the court in 34 contests, averaging 2.9 points as well as 2.7 rebounds a contest in 8.4 minutes per game. He left the Gonzaga men’s basketball team in October 2018 to focus on school, remaining on scholarship.

International career 
In 2012, Larsen was selected to play on Denmark’s U16 national team at the 2012 European Championships (Division B), where he averaged 12.1 points, 8.5 boards as well as 1.9 blocks per contest.

The following year, he was the main man on Denmark’s U16 squad that captured gold at the 2013 European Championships (Division B). He scored 20.0 points and pulled down 12.1 rebounds while blocking 4.0 shots a game en route to Eurobasket.com All-European Championships U16 Division B Best Player honors.

In February and March 2015, Larsen played in his first Adidas Next Generation Tournament in Belgrade for the U18 Vaerlose BBK squad and was named as one of the stars to watch in the event. He averaged 16.7 points, 6.7 rebounds, 2.3 assists, 1.7 blocks, 1 steal, and 60.6 percent from the field.

Personal 
His older brother Rasmus Larsen who was also a basketball player died in May 2015 at the age of 20.

References

External links 
 Gonzaga Bulldogs bio
 Jacob Larsen at eurobasket.com

1997 births
Living people
People from Rudersdal Municipality
Centers (basketball)
Danish expatriate basketball people in the United States
Danish men's basketball players
Gonzaga Bulldogs men's basketball players
Power forwards (basketball)
SISU BK players
Sportspeople from the Capital Region of Denmark